A Busy Day is a 1914 short film starring Charlie Chaplin and Mack Swain.

Plot
In A Busy Day, a wife (played by an energetic Charlie Chaplin) becomes jealous of her husband's interest in another woman during a military parade. On her way to attack the couple, the wife interrupts the set of a film, knocking over a film director and a police officer. Finally, the husband pushes the wife off a pier and she falls into the harbor.

Notes
According to the 1965 book The Films of Charlie Chaplin, A Busy Day is the first of three films in which Chaplin plays a woman. The other two were The Masquerader (1914) and A Woman (1915). Chaplin used the wardrobe of fellow Keystone player Alice Davenport.

It was typical for Mack Sennett to shoot Keystone comedies using real events—such as a parade—as the background for comic mayhem. This short film (about half a reel) was shot near San Pedro Harbor in less than two hours. In it, one can see interesting glimpses of First World War-era American naval ships in the background. The other part of the reel is an educational short titled The Morning Papers.

Review

A reviewer from Bioscope noted, "[Chaplin] gives an amazing exhibition of acrobatic humor."

Cast
 Charles Chaplin as Wife
 Mack Swain as Husband
 Phyllis Allen as The Other Woman
 Mack Sennett as Film director
 Billy Gilbert as Police officer
 Ted Edwards as Police officer

External links
 
 
 
 

1914 films
American black-and-white films
Short films directed by Charlie Chaplin
1914 comedy films
American silent short films
Silent American comedy films
Keystone Studios films
Films produced by Mack Sennett
1914 short films
Articles containing video clips
American comedy short films
Mutual Film films
1910s English-language films
1910s American films